Eucalyptus prominens is a species of mallee that is endemic to a small area on the west coast of Western Australia. It has smooth greyish bark, sometimes with rough bark near the base, lance-shaped adult leaves, flower buds in groups of seven or nine, white flowers and conical fruit.

Description
It has smooth greyish to brownish bark, sometimes with fibrous bark at the base of the trunk. Flowering occurs from August to Octoberand the flowers are white.

Taxonomy and naming
Eucalyptus prominens was first described in 1976 by Ian Brooker in the journal Nuytsia from material collected in the Shothole Canyon in the Cape Range National Park in 1970. The specific epithet (prominens) is a Latin word meaning "prominent", referring to the valves of the fruit, compared to those or related species.

Distribution and habitat
This mallee is restricted to limestone hills and valleys in the Cape Range in the Carvarvon biogeographic region.

Conservation status
This eucalypt is classified as "not threatened" by the Western Australian Government Department of Parks and Wildlife,

See also
List of Eucalyptus species

References

Eucalypts of Western Australia
prominens
Myrtales of Australia
Plants described in 1976
Taxa named by Ian Brooker